WOAI (1200 kHz) is a commercial AM radio station in San Antonio, Texas, which airs a news/talk format. It is owned and operated by locally based iHeartMedia, Inc., and is that company's flagship station. Studios are located in the Stone Oak neighborhood in Far North San Antonio. Its non-directional antenna transmitter site is off Santa Clara Road in Zuehl, Texas.

WOAI promotion refers to the station as the "50,000 Watt Blowtorch" of South Texas.  It is a Class A clear-channel station, broadcasting fulltime at the U.S. maximum power of 50,000 watts. In the daytime, WOAI covers most of Central and South Texas, providing at least secondary coverage as far north as the Waco suburbs and as far south as Corpus Christi. With a good radio, WOAI's nighttime signal reaches much of the United States and Mexico, and parts of central Canada. However, it is strongest in the central United States. WOAI audio streaming is also available through iHeartRadio.

Programming 
WOAI airs a mix of local and nationally syndicated talk shows.  Weekdays begin with San Antonio's First News with Charlie Parker, followed by Glenn Beck, The Clay Travis and Buck Sexton Show, Sean Hannity, Michael Berry (based at co-owned KTRH Houston), The Jesse Kelly Show, Coast to Coast AM with George Noory and This Morning, America's First News with Gordon Deal.  Joe Pagliarulo, known on the air as "Joe Pags", hosts a syndicated talk show in PM drive time based at WOAI.  Weekends feature syndicated hosts Kim Komando and Bill Cunningham.

The station is the flagship for the San Antonio Spurs basketball radio network, and also airs Texas Longhorns football.

History
WOAI was first licensed on September 14, 1922, to the Southern Equipment Company in San Antonio. The call sign was randomly assigned from a sequential list. Although currently the Mississippi River is used as the dividing line between western "K" and eastern "W" call letters, prior to January 1923 the dividing line was located at the Texas-New Mexico border, and stations licensed earlier were allowed to keep their original call signs. Both co-owned WOAI-TV, and briefly WOAI-FM, were later also allowed to use this call sign, and WOAI and WOAI-TV are currently the westernmost stations with "W" call signs.

WOAI made its debut broadcast on September 25, 1922, from studios located in the Southern Equipment Company Building at Romana and St. Mary's Streets. Its original transmitter was rated at 500 watts, considered a high power at the time, which station publicity boasted was "a plant bigger and better than any in the south". The station was initially authorized to broadcast on both the "entertainment" wavelength of 360 meters (833 kHz) and the "market and weather reports" wavelength of 485 meters (619 kHz). However, in May 1923 the Department of Commerce, which regulated U.S. radio at this time, set aside a band of "Class B" frequencies that were reserved for stations that had quality equipment and programming. The San Antonio area was assigned exclusive use of 780 kHz, and WOAI was authorized to move to this new assignment.

Over the next few years regulators struggled to keep pace with a rapidly growing number of stations, and WOAI was moved to a variety of frequencies, beginning with 760 kHz in early 1925, followed by 940 and 600 kHz in the fall of 1927, and 1070 kHz in early 1928. On November 11, 1928, as part of the implementation of the Federal Radio Commission's General Order 40, WOAI was designated as the primary station assigned to the "clear channel" frequency of 1190 kHz. Also during this time period the station was authorized to move its transmitter site and increase its power from 500 to 1,000 watts; then to 2,000 watts, and then 5,000; and finally to 50,000 watts in 1930. On March 21, 1941, as part of a major reallocation due to the adoption of the North American Regional Broadcasting Agreement, WOAI was moved to 1200 kHz, and until the 1980s was the only station of significant power licensed to this frequency in North America.

During the 1930s, WOAI was an NBC Red Network affiliate. In the 1940s, the station developed a sizable agricultural department and aired frequent farm market reports. In 1949, WOAI-TV came on the air as San Antonio's first TV station. Because WOAI Radio was an NBC affiliate, Channel 4 was primarily an NBC-TV station, although it also carried some programs from CBS, ABC and Dumont.

In 1956, a Boeing B-29 hit WOAI's transmitter tower, destroying it. The plane made a crash landing, killing one passenger. No one on the ground was injured.

In 1933 the corporate name was changed to Southland Industries, Inc., which would hold the license for more than four decades. As network programming moved from radio to television in the 1950s, WOAI switched to a full service middle of the road music format, with frequent newscasts, farm reports and sports. 

In 1965, WOAI AM-FM-TV were acquired by the Crosley Broadcasting Corporation, originally founded in Ohio by Powel Crosley Jr.  Crosley Broadcasting changed its name to Avco in 1968. Avco sold WOAI-TV to United Stations which changed the call sign to KMOL-TV.

On June 13, 1975, San Antonio businessmen L. Lowry Mays and BJ "Red" McCombs acquired the WOAI radio station from Avco Broadcasting. They already owned easy listening FM station KEEZ (now KAJA, acquired in 1972, and switched to a Top 40 format. WOAI's "clear channel" signal would become the namesake of their new company, Clear Channel Communications.

WOAI began to move towards talk programming, and stopped playing music by the late 1970s.  In 1979, KEEZ switched its call letters to WOAI-FM, becoming in 1981 country music station KAJA "KJ*97". Through the 1980s, WOAI relied more on its newsroom and focused on local and national news, local talk shows and agricultural reports. The station also began including sports play-by-play, especially after acquiring the radio contract for all San Antonio Spurs NBA basketball games. WOAI was the radio home of the San Antonio Gunslingers in the United States Football League (USFL).

In 1998, Clear Channel acquired the parent company of Premiere Radio Networks, which syndicated national talk shows such as Rush Limbaugh, Dr. Laura, Dr. Dean Edell, The Jim Rome Show and Coast to Coast AM.  Rush and Dr. Laura had already been airing in San Antonio on competitor KTSA and were switched over to WOAI's line up.  WOAI news anchor Bob Guthrie celebrated 50 years on the radio station in 2006.

In 2001, WOAI regained a TV sister station when Clear Channel acquired KMOL-TV, which had been WOAI-TV from its founding in 1949 until its sale in 1974. In December 2002, KMOL-TV was granted permission from the Federal Communications Commission (FCC) to change its call sign back to WOAI-TV. The TV station has since been sold twice, to Newport Television and then to current owner Sinclair Broadcast Group. In May 2012, WOAI briefly added an FM simulcast over translator station K289BN at 105.7 MHz, but this only lasted for four months, and on September 19, 2012, the translator switched to simulcasting co-owned classic country station KRPT.

On September 16, 2014, Clear Channel renamed itself iHeartMedia, Inc., to bring its corporate name in line with its iHeartRadio internet platform.

References

External links
 WOAI Radio
 WOAI San Antonio Texas - Engineering and Technology History Wiki

 FCC History Cards for WOAI (covering 1929-1981)

µ
News and talk radio stations in the United States
Radio stations established in 1922
1922 establishments in Texas
IHeartMedia radio stations
Clear-channel radio stations
Radio stations licensed before 1923 and still broadcasting